This was a new event in 2013. Anne Keothavong won the title, defeating Sandra Záhlavová in the final, 7–6(7–3), 6–3.

Seeds

Main draw

Finals

Top half

Bottom half

References 
 Main draw

Open GDF Suez Seine-et-Marne - Singles